The 1942 Denver Pioneers football team was an American football team that represented the University of Denver as member of the Mountain States Conference (MSC) during the 1942 college football season. In their first and only season under head coach Ellison Ketchum, the Pioneers compiled a 6–3–1 record (3–2–1 against conference opponents), finished third in the MSC, and outscored opponents by a total of 182 to 98.

Schedule

References

Denver
Denver Pioneers football seasons
Denver Pioneers football